The Skirmish at Abbeville was a battle fought between the Union Army and the Confederate Army in Lafayette County, Mississippi on August 23, 1864. The battle resulted in a Union victory

References
https://www.nytimes.com/1864/09/10/news/gen-aj-smith-s-expedition-the-movement-into-mississippi.html

Abbeville
Abbeville
Conflicts in 1864
1864 in Mississippi
August 1864 events
Lafayette County, Mississippi